Balsam Lake is a lake in the City of Kawartha Lakes in Central Ontario, Canada. It is in the Great Lakes Basin, is one of the lakes of the Kawartha Lakes, and is at the summit of the Trent–Severn Waterway.

Geography
The primary inflows are the Gull River at the north and the Staples River at the southwest.

It is the highest point to which a vessel can be navigated from sea level in the Great Lakes-Saint Lawrence River drainage basin.

The main outflow, at the east, is the Rosedale River and Trent Canal leading to Cameron Lake.

The village of Coboconk is located on the north side of the lake.

Natural history
Balsam Lake Provincial Park and Indian Point Provincial Park are located on the north shore of the lake.

The lake offers excellent fishing for bass, walleye, and muskie. Mackenzie Bay in West Bay is a popular spot for boats to congregate on a warm summer day.

Map images

See also
List of lakes in Ontario

References 

Lakes of Kawartha Lakes